Armored Core: For Answer is a 2008 vehicular combat game developed by FromSoftware and published by Ubisoft for the PlayStation 3 and Xbox 360. It is the 13th installment in the mecha-based Armored Core series, the game is the direct sequel to Armored Core 4.

Gameplay
AC customization has been changed from the previous Armored Core title, with a new interface and many new parts not found in Armored Core 4. Online mode returns with a new co-operative mode alongside the player versus mode. Gameplay enhancements included a power increase for both Quick Boost and Over Boost, as well as an auxiliary high-speed booster, which is known as the Vanguard Over Booster (VOB). Another new feature in the game is the Assault Armor attack that becomes available by equipping certain Over boost parts. This attack uses up all available Primal Armor (PA) that the AC has and generates a huge blast consisting of Kojima particles (highly reactive particles) that destroys or damages all objects surrounding the AC. However, this also leaves the AC vulnerable because not only will the AC lose its PA, it will also not regenerate for a few seconds. Laser blades are deadlier because of the revamped laser blade attack. Once the blade has acquired a lock-on, the AC will instantly rush to the target, traveling a great distance to use the laser blade. All parts carried over from the previous game have had their parameters altered, much like the transition between previous series installments Silent Line and Nexus. The on-screen HUD can now be changed to any of 20 colors. There are now 442 FRS tuning points available to unlock, which is an increase from the 300 (PS3) and 337 (Xbox 360) FRS points available in AC4. Maps are much larger and more detailed including environmental damage such as collapsing buildings. The game is also the second in the series (after Last Raven) to feature multiple endings, with three different possible plot branches available depending on your actions and decisions in the game.

Reception

Armored Core: For Answer received "mixed or average" reviews on both platforms according to the review aggregator website Metacritic. One of the most consistent complaints among reviewers seemed to be the lack of any sort of online community. Kevin Van Ord of GameSpot stated in his review that there were "fewer than a dozen [players on] Xbox Live" when he tried to playtest the game, and that similar attempts to find a game on PlayStation Network yielded "just a single opponent". In Japan, Famitsu gave it a score of 29 out of 40 for the PlayStation 3 version, and one nine and three sevens for the Xbox 360 version, while Famitsu Xbox 360 gave the latter console version 31 out of 40.

References

External links
 Official website (Japanese)
 

2008 video games
Armored Core
Video games about mecha
PlayStation 3 games
Third-person shooters
Ubisoft games
Video game sequels
Xbox 360 games
Multiplayer and single-player video games
Fiction about corporate warfare
Video games developed in Japan
Video games with alternate endings
Video games directed by Hidetaka Miyazaki
Video games scored by Kota Hoshino